CAC may refer to:

Arts
 California Arts Council, an agency for advancing California through the arts and creativity
 Campbelltown Arts Centre,  multidisciplinary contemporary arts centre south-west of Sydney, Australia
 Comics Arts Conference, a scholarly conference associated with Comic-Con International
 Contemporary Arts Center, an art museum in Cincinnati, Ohio
 Ciutat de les Arts i les Ciències (City of Arts and Sciences), a cultural and architectural complex in Valencia, Spain

Business and finance
Central Arbitration Committee
 CAC 40, a French stock market index
 Cotation Assistée en Continu, an electronic trading system used at the French stock exchange
 Capital account convertibility, a fiscal policy based on conducting transactions of local financial assets into foreign financial assets freely
 Collective action clause, a clause that allows a supermajority of bondholders to agree a debt restructuring that is legally binding on all holders of the bond
 Corporate Affairs Commission, Nigeria, a body that regulates companies in Nigeria
 Customer acquisition cost, the amount of money a business needs to spend to get an additional customer

Corporate
 Call Aircraft Company, an aircraft manufacturer in the United States
 Certified Acceptance Corporation, a coin grading service
 Cessna Aircraft Company, a defunct American general aviation aircraft manufacturing corporation
 Chengdu Aircraft Corporation, an aircraft manufacturer in China
 Chugach Alaska Corporation, an Alaska Native regional corporation
 Colonial Ammunition Company, a New Zealand ammunition company
 Commonwealth Aircraft Corporation, an Australian aircraft manufacturer
 Conquest Airlines (ICAO airline designator)
 Consolidated Aircraft Corporation
 Copa Airlines Colombia
 Carrington American Central
 Copper Australia Courier
 Cambridge Aero Coorporation

Education
 Cairo American College, a school in Cairo, Egypt
 Coomera Anglican College, a school in Queensland, Australia
 Carmel Adventist College, a school in Western Australia, Australia
 , a middle school in Tuen Mun, Hong Kong

United States
 Central Arizona College, a community college in Coolidge, Arizona
 Commissioner's Academic Challenge, a Florida high school academic tournament
 Central Arkansas Christian Schools, a school system in North Little Rock, Arkansas

Military
 U.S. Army Coast Artillery Corps, a U.S. Army corps
 Combined Action Company, a joint unit of the Combined Action Program of U.S. Marines and South Vietnamese Regional Forces during the Vietnam war
 United States Army Combined Arms Center, a component of the Training and Doctrine Command
 Canadian Armoured Corps, renamed in 1945 to Royal Canadian Armoured Corps
 Canadian Aviation Corps, the predecessor to the Royal Canadian Air Force
 Common Access Card, a U.S. military identification card
 Colombian armed conflict (1964–present), an internal war in Colombia

Politics and religion
 Campaign Against Censorship, a UK pressure group that opposes censorship
 Central Advisory Commission, a political commission of the People's Republic of China
 Central Advisory Council, a body set up by the Imperial Japanese Army in the occupied Dutch East Indies
 Central Asian Commonwealth, an organization later renamed to Organization of Central Asian Cooperation
 Coalition against Communalism, a San Francisco Bay area organization concerned with communalism in South Asia
 Constitutional Accountability Center, a Washington, D.C. think tank
 CPSU Central Auditing Commission, an organ of the Communist Party of the Soviet Union
 Christians Against the Coup, an Egyptian political movement opposing the recent 2013 coup d'état in Egypt
 Christ Apostolic Church
 Church at Charlotte, an evangelical free church in Charlotte, NC
 Cyberspace Administration of China, a government agency of the People's Republic of China

Science and technology
 Calcium carbide, a chemical compound
 Call Admission Control, a concept in voice over IP networking
 Air carbon arc cutting, an arc cutting process
 Citric acid cycle, a series of chemical reactions in cells that use oxygen in respiration
 Codex Alimentarius Commission, an organisation which maintains food standards
 Common Access Card, smart card used by the Active Duty United States Defense personnel
 Criteria air contaminants, a group of air pollutants
 Charge air cooler, part of an internal combustion engine
 Carrier access code
 Система Аварийного Спасения (transliteration from the Russian alphabet: Sistema Avariynogo Spaseniya, SAS), the Soyuz launch escape system
 CAC, a codon for the amino acid histidine
 CaC, Configuration as Code

Medicine
 Coronary Artery Calcium

Sports and games
 Cardiff Athletic Club, a Cardiff-based multi sport organisation
 Castles and Crusades, a role-playing game
 Cauliflower Alley Club, a wrestling and boxing organization
 Commonwealth Athletic Conference, a high school athletic conference in Massachusetts, United States
 Confédération Africaine de Cyclisme (African Cycling Confederation), a confederation of governing bodies for cycling in Africa
 Capital Athletic Conference, former name of the US intercollegiate athletic conference now known as the Coast to Coast Athletic Conference
 Central American and Caribbean Games, a multi-sport regional championships event
 Command & Conquer, a series of video games
 Cricket Australia Cup, now the Futures League, an Australian cricket competition
 Club Athlétique Canadien, a Montreal-based ice hockey team
Copa América Centenario